Rashad Washington (born March 15, 1980) is a former American football safety. Washington now serves as the defensive coordinator for the Texas Revolution of Champions Indoor Football (CIF). He was drafted by the New York Jets in the seventh round of the 2004 NFL Draft. He played college football at Kansas State, and played tailback and defensive back at Wichita Southeast.

College career
While attending Kansas State University, he played in 49 games (38 on defense and 11 on offense) with 28 starts. He had come into Kansas State as a premier tailback, but made the shift to strong safety as a sophomore. On defense, he finished with 195 tackles, three sacks, three fumble recoveries, three forced fumbles, three interceptions, and two touchdowns. On special teams, he returned five blocked punts for 125 yards, and added 14 rushes for 106 yards and a reception for a 33-yard TD on offense.
He also was a practice player for the basketball team for the 2000–2001 season, playing in 8 games.

Professional career

New York Jets
Washington was selected by the Jets in the seventh round (236th overall) of the 2004 NFL Draft.  He saw action in 47 games from 2004 to 2007, making 77 tackles, 1.5 sacks and deflected 2 passes. He was released by the team on November 5, 2007.

Wichita Wild
On December 12, 2010 Washington signed a one-year deal with the Wichita Wild. His contract was renewed after the Wild's 2011 season.

Kansas City Renegades
Spent the 2013 Season with the Kansas City franchise of the CPIFL.

Texas Revolution
In 2014, Washington signed with the Texas Revolution of the Indoor Football League. Washington re-signed with the Revolution, who were moving to Champions Indoor Football, on October 1, 2014.

Coaching career
Washington joined the Revolution coaching staff in November, 2015 for the 2016 season.

References

1980 births
Living people
Players of American football from Wichita, Kansas
American football safeties
Kansas State Wildcats football players
New York Jets players
Wichita Wild players
Kansas City Renegades players
Salina Bombers players
Texas Revolution players
Wichita Southeast High School alumni